James William Murphy (April 17, 1858 – July 11, 1927) was a U.S. Representative from Wisconsin.

Born in Platteville, Wisconsin in 1858, Murphy graduated from the State Normal School (now the University of Wisconsin–Platteville) in 1873 and from the University of Michigan Law School in 1880. He practiced law in Platteville, and served as district attorney of Grant County, Wisconsin from 1887 to 1891. He was elected mayor of Platteville for a two-year term in 1904, and was then elected to the United States House of Representatives as a Democrat in 1906, defeating Joseph W. Babcock for the seat from Wisconsin's 3rd congressional district. Murphy served one term as part of the 60th United States Congress, but was defeated for reelection in 1908 by Arthur W. Kopp. He ran unsuccessfully for Congress once more, in 1920. He died in Rochester, Minnesota in 1927.

Notes

External links

1858 births
1927 deaths
University of Wisconsin–Platteville alumni
University of Michigan Law School alumni
Mayors of places in Wisconsin
People from Platteville, Wisconsin
Democratic Party members of the United States House of Representatives from Wisconsin